Frank Thomas' Big Hurt is a pinball machine designed by Bill Parker and released by Gottlieb in 1995. The game features a baseball theme and is named after Frank Thomas.

Description
The playfield of the game is laid out like a stadium with roaring crowds, a play-by-play announcer and features a moving baseball glove. The game has three flippers, two pop bumpers, two slingshots, drop targets, a captive ball, and a four-ball multi-ball.

The artwork of the sidebox is very bright and the head artwork features a flaming baseball.

Digital versions
Frank Thomas' Big Hurt is available as a licensed table of The Pinball Arcade for several platforms. Reebok logos are removed because of licensing issues.

See also
Frank Thomas Big Hurt Baseball, a video game

References

External links
 Internet Pinball Database entry for Frank Thomas' Big Hurt

1995 pinball machines
Gottlieb pinball machines